The Riverside Fire Department is the agency that provides fire protection and emergency medical services for the city of Riverside, California.  the department is responsible for servicing a population of 314,034 in an area of .

History

The City of Riverside Fire Department can trace its origin back to 1875 from a newspaper article referencing the response of a hose cart to a fire in the township of Riverside.  An unorganized group of volunteers existed in the Riverside township from December 1871 to April 1882. In April 1882, Frank Miller, the owner of the Mission Inn, convinced local businessmen to contribute towards a wagon and fire buckets, costing $500. Subsequently, William Hayt, a businessman and owner of several stage lines, began a drive to establish a complete fire department. Hayt got the city's Board of Trustees agreement to establish the Riverside Fire Department, but only after Hayt offered to raise half the money from local businessmen, and to put up the other half of the funds himself, to be reimbursed later.  Hayt was able to raise $527, he loaned the city an additional $516, and the Riverside Fire Department was officially established on October 7, 1887.

The first major fire to confront the new fire department was on April 21, 1888, when the Pavilion, a large wood-frame structure used for many social occasions such as theaters, dances, and general meeting space, burned to the ground. Nearly two decades later, in February 1906, the first station was built for the Riverside Fire Department at the corner of 8th and Lime Streets.

The department received its first motorized unit in September 1909, with the $4,750 purchase of a Seagrave, hose wagon and chemical engine. Following another major fire in 1924 at the Motor Transit building, the number of fire hydrants in the city was doubled. By 1938, the department had grown to 33 firefighters and five engine companies spread out across four stations. Starting in 1998, the department transitioned to the Advanced Life Support (ALS) level of support.

USAR Task Force 6

The RFD is the sponsoring agency of California Task Force 6 (CA-TF6), one of the eight FEMA Urban Search and Rescue Task Forces spread out across the state. The task force is prepared to respond to a variety of emergencies or disasters, including earthquakes, hurricanes, typhoons, storms, tornadoes, floods, dam failures, terrorist attacks and other natural or man-made disasters. Some of their most notable responses include the Northridge earthquake (1994), the Oklahoma City bombing (1995) and Hurricane Katrina (2005).

Stations and apparatus 
The RFD has 14 stations in the city.

Past Chiefs 
LaWayne Hearn (2022 - Present)

Michael Moore (2014-2022)

Michael Esparza (2013 - 2014)

Steven H. Earley (2009 - 2013)

Tedd Laycock (2005 - 2009)

Dave Carlson (1996 - 2005)

Michael Vonada (1993 - 1996)

Douglas Greene (1986 - 1992)

Richard Bosted (1977 - 1986)

Fred Woodard (1973 - 1977)

Burney Montgomery (1959 - 1973)

Ray Allen (1942 - 1959)

William Taylor (1938 - 1942)

Ed Mosbaugh (1931 - 1938)

Jack Hutchinson (1929 - 1931)

John Bayha (1928 - 1929)

Jack Hutchinson (1926 - 1928)

Joseph Schneider (1901 - 1926)

S.L. Wight (1897 - 1901)

W.G. Polcene (1897 - 1897)

S.R. Smith (1896 - 1897)

G.F. Ward (1890 - 1896)

J.N. Keith (1887 - 1890)

References

Fire departments in California
Fire Department
Organizations based in Riverside, California
1887 establishments in California